Rasoolpur is a town in India, 10 km from Salon. 

Cities and towns in Raebareli district